Give Me My Flowers While I Can Still Smell Them is the second studio album by American hip hop duo Blu & Exile. Leaked online in 2011, it was released by Dirty Science and Fat Beats on September 4, 2012.

Music
The album features guest contributions from Fashawn, Homeboy Sandman, Johaz of Dag Savage, Black Spade of Hawthorne Headhunters, and ADAD.

Critical reception
At Metacritic, which assigns a weighted average score out of 100 to reviews from mainstream critics, the album received an average score of 76% based on 5 reviews, indicating "generally favorable reviews".

David Amidon of PopMatters gave the album 8 stars out of 10, saying, "Blu may have spent most of his post-Below the Heavens career burning one bridge after another, but Give Me My Flowers is not only a better album, it's an atonement for all the swerves he's thrown audiences' way since breaking out." Meanwhile, Phillip Mlynar of HipHopDX gave the album a 3.0 out of 5, saying, "Blu and Exile are without doubt a couple of super-talented Rap chaps, but they need to step out of their snug comfort zone – and sharply."

Track listing

Charts

References

External links
 

2012 albums
Collaborative albums
Blu (rapper) albums
Albums produced by Exile (producer)